The City of Los Angeles Department of Recreation and Parks operates and maintains Los Angeles City parks, playgrounds, swimming pools, golf courses, skateparks, and recreation centers; as well as, providing recreational programming.

History 
In 1904, Los Angeles founded the first city-run Playground and Recreation Department in the United States, with the first playground opening the following year. In 1947, the Los Angeles city government combined the Department of Parks and the Department of Playgrounds and Recreation into the Department of Recreation and Parks, combining the two organizations.

Griffith Observatory 
Since opening in 1935, Griffith Observatory has been owned and operated by the City of Los Angeles Department of Recreation and Parks.

List of parks in Los Angeles

References

Government of Los Angeles
Environment of Greater Los Angeles